The Calgary Alberta Temple is the 140th temple of the Church of Jesus Christ of Latter-day Saints (LDS Church) and the third built in Alberta. The first, previously known as the Alberta Temple, was built in Cardston in 1923. The Edmonton Alberta Temple opened in 1999.

History
LDS Church president Thomas S. Monson announced the construction of the Calgary Alberta Temple on 4 October 2008, during the church's 178th Semiannual General Conference. The temple serves over 18,000 Latter-day Saints in Calgary and surrounding areas. The temple is located adjacent to the Royal Oak chapel in northwest Calgary.

The groundbreaking on May 15, 2010 was presided over by Donald L. Hallstrom, with other general and area leaders of the church in attendance, including William R. Walker and Richard K. Melchin. Once the building was completed, a public open house was held from September 29 to October 20, 2012, where over 100,000 people toured the temple. A cultural celebration was held October 27, 2012, and the temple was dedicated the following day, October 28, by Monson.

The first president of the temple was Blair S. Bennett, a former stake president and area seventy from Sherwood Park, Alberta.  As of November 2019, John W. Swendsen, a native Calgarian, is the current president.

In 2020, like all the church's other temples, the Calgary Alberta Temple was closed in response to the coronavirus pandemic.

See also

 Comparison of temples of The Church of Jesus Christ of Latter-day Saints
 List of places of worship in Calgary
 List of temples of The Church of Jesus Christ of Latter-day Saints
 List of temples of The Church of Jesus Christ of Latter-day Saints by geographic region
 Temple architecture (Latter-day Saints)
 The Church of Jesus Christ of Latter-day Saints in Canada

References

External links
Calgary Alberta Temple Official site
Calgary Alberta Temple at ChurchofJesusChristTemples.org

Temples (LDS Church) completed in 2012
Religious buildings and structures in Calgary
Temples (LDS Church) in Alberta
2012 establishments in Alberta
2012 in Christianity
21st-century religious buildings and structures in Canada